"Don't Go Breaking My Heart" is a 1976 duet by Elton John and Kiki Dee.

Don't Go Breaking My Heart may also refer to:

Film and television
Don't Go Breaking My Heart (1999 film), a British film
Don't Go Breaking My Heart (2011 film), a Hong Kong-Chinese romantic comedy film
"Don't Go Breaking My Heart" (Frasier), a television episode

Music
"Don't Go Breaking My Heart" (Agnes song), 2011
"Don't Go Breaking My Heart" (Backstreet Boys song), 2018
"Don't Go Breaking My Heart" (Sonic Dream Collective song), 1995
"Don't Go Breaking My Heart", a song by Dionne Warwick from Here I Am, 1965
"Don't Go Breaking My Heart", a 1994 Elton John re-release with Ru-Paul
"Don't Go Breaking My Heart", a song by Atomic Kitten from Ladies Night, 2003
"Don't Go Breaking My Heart", a song by Herb Alpert and the Tijuana Brass from S.R.O., 1966

See also
Breaking My Heart (disambiguation)
Don't Break My Heart (disambiguation)